Poiretia elegans is a species of flowering plants in the family Fabaceae. It is found in Brazil (Minas Gerais).

References

External links

Dalbergieae
Flora of Brazil
Plants described in 1986